Chapit-e Olya (also Romanized as Chāp‘īt-e ‘Olyā; also known as Choqā Peyat-e ‘Olyā, Choghā Peyat-e ‘Olyā , Chagha Beit Olya, Chāh-e Pait, Chāh-i-Pait, and Choqā Peyat) is a village in Tarhan-e Gharbi Rural District, Tarhan District, Kuhdasht County, Lorestan Province, Iran. At the 2006 census, its population was 867 in 164 families.

References 

Towns and villages in Kuhdasht County